Afrogortyna is a genus of moths of the family Noctuidae.

Species
 Afrogortyna altimontana Krüger, 1997
 Afrogortyna trinota (Herrich-Schäffer, [1854])

References
 Afrogortyna at Markku Savela's Lepidoptera and Some Other Life Forms
 Natural History Museum Lepidoptera genus database

Xyleninae
Noctuoidea genera